State Route 96 (SR 96) is an east–west and north–south highway in Middle Tennessee. The road begins in Dickson and ends in Granville. Along its path it goes through 10 counties. Locals mostly refer to it as Highway 96.

SR 96 changes cardinal directions from East–West to North–South in DeKalb County after an unsigned concurrency with U.S. 70.

Route description

Dickson County
SR 96 begins as a primary highway in Dickson County in Dickson at an intersection with US 70/SR 1. It then goes southeast, leaving Dickson, before coming to an intersection with SR 47 in Burns. It then curves to the east and parallels I-40, passing just north of the I-40/I-840 interchange, before having an interchange with I-40 (Exit 182) just west of Fairview, just after crossing into Williamson County.

Williamson and Davidson counties

SR 96 then enters Fairview and has a trumpet interchange and become concurrent with SR 100. They then go northeast and cross over the southern part of the Highland Rim just before crossing into the southwest corner of Davidson County. SR 96 then separates from SR 100 and then turns southeast to cross back into Williamson County. Just after crossing the county line, SR 96 has an interchange with the Natchez Trace Parkway, just after passing under the Natchez Trace Parkway Bridge. It then goes through some wooded areas before having an intersection with SR 46 just before entering Franklin. SR 96 then travels through some suburban areas before intersecting and becoming concurrent with US 431/SR 106 in downtown. They first go south before SR 96 turns east at an intersection with US 31/SR 6, which is also where US 431/SR 106 split off and continue south. SR 96 then splits off from US 31/SR 6 and goes east, leaving downtown and having an intersection with SR 397 and then an interchange with I-65 (Exit 65) before leaving Franklin and continuing southeast. SR 96 then passes through some farmland before passing through Arrington and having an intersection with SR 252. It then begins paralleling I-840 just before entering Triune, where it has an intersection with US 31A/SR 11, just north of its interchange with I-840 (Exit 42). SR 96 then goes east and crosses under the interstate before crossing into Rutherford County.

Rutherford County

It then almost immediately has an intersection with SR 102 just south of Almaville, which is also just south of its interchange with I-840 (Exit 47). SR 96 then leaves the interstate and passes through some rural countryside before entering Murfreesboro just before a partial cloverleaf interchange with I-24 (Exit 78). It then passes through a major retail district, passing by Stones River Mall and having an intersection and becoming concurrent with SR 99, before entering downtown and having an intersection with US 41/US 70S/US 231/SR 1/SR 10, with SR 96 curving to the northeast to become concurrent with US 231/SR 10 as they turn northeast at this intersection from the south. They go northeast, leaving downtown, for about a mile before SR 96 turns east onto E Clark Blvd. for a short distance before turning northeast again onto Lascassas Pike. SR 96 then has an intersection with SR 268 before it leaves Murfreesboro and continues northeast through countryside once more. It then passes through Lascassas and intersects and has a short concurrency with SR 266. SR 96 then curves to the east and passes through some more rural farmland and countryside, passing through Milton before crossing into northwest corner Cannon County.

Cannon and Wilson counties

SR 96 passes through Auburntown, where it has an intersection with the northern terminus of SR 145, before crossing into the southeast corner of Wilson County. It intersects with SR 267 just across the county line, south of Statesville, before passing through Prosperity and Cottage Home and into DeKalb County.

DeKalb County

Coming to an intersection with US 70/SR 26/SR 53 near Liberty, SR 96 turns east along a concurrency. They enter Liberty at an intersection where SR 53 separates and turns south toward Woodbury. The routes then pass through Liberty and Dowelltown and ascend the Highland Rim before SR 96 separates from US 70/SR 26, just northwest of Smithville. It becomes signed as a north–south route along a very curvy secondary highway known as Dale Ridge Road. It makes its way northward, encountering and serving as the southern terminus of SR 264. It follows along the shoreline of Center Hill Lake before coming to an intersection with SR 141 at Center Hill Dam. The two routes become concurrent and cross overtop Center Hill Dam together before separating at the entrance to Edgar Evins State Park, with SR 96 turning north toward Putnam County.

Putnam and Smith counties

It crosses the county line and immediately enters Buffalo Valley, where it has another interchange with I-40 (Exit 268). It then winds north through farmland, crossing briefly into the far eastern portion of Smith County before reentering Putnam County. SR 96 quickly comes to an intersection with US 70N/SR 24 east of Chestnut Mound, at which point it becomes concurrent. They go east and wind through more hilly terrain before SR 96 splits off and winds north as Shaw Branch Road, before crossing into Jackson County.

Jackson County

SR 96 then runs along Martin's Creek, an arm of Cordell Hull Lake/Cumberland River, before entering Granville and terminating at SR 53 in town.

Major intersections 

|-
|rowspan=3|Dickson
|rowspan=2|Dickson
|colspan=4|
|-

|-
|colspan=4|
|-

See also 
List of Tennessee state highways

References 

096
Transportation in Dickson County, Tennessee
Transportation in Williamson County, Tennessee
Transportation in Nashville, Tennessee
Transportation in Davidson County, Tennessee
Transportation in Rutherford County, Tennessee
Transportation in Cannon County, Tennessee
Transportation in Wilson County, Tennessee
Transportation in DeKalb County, Tennessee
Transportation in Putnam County, Tennessee
Transportation in Smith County, Tennessee
Transportation in Jackson County, Tennessee